George W. Healey (22 February 1842 - 9 May 1913) was a veteran of the American Civil War and a recipient of the Medal of Honor.

Biography
Healy was born in 1842 in Dubuque, Iowa. During his early life, he primarily worked on his family's farm and at  local hardware dealership. In 1861, upon the outbreak of the Civil War, Healely joined the army for reasons of patriotism. He claimed that anyone who did not take up arms against the South was a rebel. In 1863, Healey was wounded in the head by a ball during a skirmish with Confederate forces in Tennessee. He survived the injury, but permanently lost his vision in his left eye.

Battle of Brown's Mill
In July 1864, Healey, under the command of General Edward M. McCook, was led into Georgia in an attempt to disrupt rail supplies and traffic. On July 29, was separated from his unit during an encounter with Confederate forces. Healey discovered a lone Confederate soldier and succeeded in capturing him and his firearm. Healey, joined by Private Martin, another displaced Union soldier, captured four more Confederates who had been trailing them.

McCook's invasion of Georgia was ultimately a failure, and many of his soldiers, including Healey, were captured. Healey was ultimately sent to Andersonville Prison.

Citation

Later life
Healely survived his capture and stay at Andersonville. In 1868, he married May Moser. He also worked at the Doolittle & Chamberlain business as a bookkeeper and salesmen. He later became a partner in the business and expanded it greatly. Healey died in 1913.

See also
5th Iowa Volunteer Cavalry Regiment
Atlanta Campaign
Battle of Brown's Mill

Notes

References

External links

1842 births
1913 deaths
American Civil War recipients of the Medal of Honor
Burials in Iowa
People of Iowa in the American Civil War
People from Dubuque, Iowa
Union Army soldiers
United States Army Medal of Honor recipients